The 2022 NCAA Division III men's basketball tournament was a single-elimination tournament to determine the national champion of men's NCAA Division III college basketball in the United States. Featuring sixty-four teams, it began on March 4, 2022, following the 2021–22 season, and concluded with the championship game on March 19, 2022.

The national semifinal and championship rounds were held at the Allen County War Memorial Coliseum in Fort Wayne, Indiana. The tournament was won by the Randolph–Macon Yellow Jackets, which "repeated" as national champions.  During the 2021 season, the Yellow Jackets had won a mythical national championship from polls organised by D3Sports.com and a "bowl game" style game against the Trine Thunder in 2021.

This was the first tournament completed since 2019 after the two previous editions were cancelled due to the COVID-19 pandemic.

Tournament schedule and venues

First and second rounds

First and second round games were played at campus sites on March 4 and March 5.

On the basis of team strength and geography, these locations were chosen to host first and second round games in the 2022 tournament:

Kolf Sports Center, Oshkosh, Wisconsin (Host: University of Wisconsin–Oshkosh)
Mayborn Campus Center, Belton, Texas (Host: University of Mary Hardin–Baylor)
Williams Fieldhouse, Platteville, Wisconsin (Host: University of Wisconsin–Platteville)
R.A. Fagenel Hall, Elmhurst, Illinois (Host: Elmhurst University)
Woodruff Physical Education Center, Atlanta, Georgia (Host: Emory University)
McPherson Academic and Athletic Complex, Alliance, Ohio (Host: University of Mount Union)
Shirk Center, Bloomington, Illinois (Host: Illinois Wesleyan University)
Washington University Field House, St. Louis, Missouri (Host: Washington University in St. Louis)
Ban Johnson Arena, Marietta, Ohio (Host: Marietta College)
Tarble Pavilion, Swarthmore, Pennsylvania (Host: Swarthmore College)
Freeman Center, Newport News, Virginia (Host: Christopher Newport University)
Stockton University Sports Center, Galloway Township, New Jersey (Host: Stockton University)
Crenshaw Gymnasium, Ashland, Virginia (Host: Randolph–Macon College)
Robert A. Kidera Gymnasium, Pittsford, New York (Host: Nazareth College)
Freeman Athletic Center, Middletown, Connecticut (Host: Wesleyan University)
Harrington Auditorium, Worcester, Massachusetts (Host: Worcester Polytechnic Institute)

Third and fourth rounds

Third and fourth round games were played at campus sites on March 11 and March 12.

At the conclusion of the second round, the NCAA announced the following locations would host third and fourth round games.

Horsburgh Gymnasium, Cleveland, Ohio (Host: Case Western Reserve University)
Shirk Center, Bloomington, Illinois (Host: Illinois Wesleyan University)
Ban Johnson Arena, Marietta, Ohio (Host: Marietta College)
Crenshaw Gymnasium, Ashland, Virginia (Host: Randolph–Macon College)

National Semifinals and Championship

The National Semifinals and Championship will take place on March 18 and March 19.

Allen County War Memorial Coliseum, Fort Wayne, Indiana (Host: Manchester University)

Fort Wayne will host the Final Four for the second time, having previously hosted in 2019. Fort Wayne was also scheduled to host the Final Four in 2020 and 2021, before those editions of the tournament were canceled due to COVID-19 concerns.

Qualifying teams

Automatic bids (44)
The following 44 teams were automatic qualifiers for the 2022 NCAA field by virtue of winning their conference's automatic bid (except for the UAA, whose regular-season champion received the automatic bid).

At-large bids (20)

The following 20 teams were awarded qualification for the tournament field by the NCAA Division III Men's Basketball Committee. The committee evaluated teams on the basis of their win–loss percentage, strength of schedule, head-to-head results, results against common opponents, and results against teams included in the NCAA's final regional rankings.

Tournament bracket

* – Denotes overtime period

Top-left - Cleveland, Ohio

Cleveland Sectional Final

Bottom-left - Bloomington, Illinois

Bloomington Sectional Final

Top-right - Marietta, Ohio

Marietta Sectional Final

Bottom-right - Ashland, Virginia

Ashland Sectional Final

Final Four

National Semifinals

National Championship

All-Tournament Team
 Buzz Anthony (Sr, Randolph–Macon) – Most Outstanding Player
 Miles Mallory (Jr, Randolph–Macon)
 Jake Rhode (Sr, Elmhurst)
 Lukas Isaly (Sr, Marietta)
 Jack Davidson (Sr, Wabash)

Record by conference

The R64, R32, S16, E8, F4, CG, and NC columns indicate how many teams from each conference were in the round of 64 (first round), round of 32 (second round), Sweet 16, Elite Eight, Final Four, championship game, and national champion, respectively.
The Allegheny Mountain, American Rivers, Atlantic East, Colonial States, Commonwealth Coast, CUNYAC, Great Northeast, Heartland, MASCAC, Midwest, Minnesota Intercollegiate, NECC, North Atlantic, Northern Athletics, Northwest, Presidents', Skyline, SLIAC, Southern Athletic, Upper Midwest, and USA South each had one representative, eliminated in the Round of 64 with a record of 0–1.

See also
 2022 NCAA Division I men's basketball tournament
 2022 NCAA Division II men's basketball tournament
 2022 NAIA men's basketball tournament
 2022 NCAA Division III women's basketball tournament

References

Ncaa Tournament
NCAA Division III men's basketball tournament
2022 in sports in Indiana